At the 1930 British Empire Games, the rowing competition featured five events for men only. In the double sculls event, only Canada was represented, so the organisers simply invited a couple of crews from the United States to provide some opposition.

Medal summary

References
Commonwealth Games Medallists – Rowing. GBR Athletics. Retrieved on 21 July 2010.

1930 British Empire Games events
1930
Brit
Rowing competitions in Canada